Makoto Hasegawa (長谷川誠, born 2 April 1971) is a Japanese basketball coach and a former player. Hasegawa was the head coach of Akita Northern Happinets. He is the first Japanese player ever to play in the American Basketball Association. Because of his trademark bushy goatee, his nickname is "hige" in Akita. He played for Kosei Club and Akita Northern Bisons as an amateur in his home prefecture. Currently he serves as an unaffiliated director of the Akita Happinets and the Japan national 3x3 team coach.

Professional career

San Diego Wildfire
In 2000 Hasegawa signed with the San Diego Wildfire, but the Japanese Jordan suffered from dirty uniforms and undelivered checks. SDW never had a single telecast or radio broadcast, a team that one night drew only 236 fans to the Sports Arena. The team's trainer, equipment manager, and cheerleaders all left and the club folded in disgrace in 2001. Former NBA players, LaSalle Thompson and Dane Suttle served as head coach.

Career statistics

Regular season 

|-
| align="left" | 2005-06
| align="left" | Niigata
|26 ||3 || 14.8 ||.426  || .364 ||.838  || 1.9 ||1.8  || 0.3 ||0.0  || 6.4
|-
| align="left" | 2006-07
| align="left" | Niigata
|37 ||29 || 18.5 ||.476  || .372 ||.861  || 1.5 ||2.2  || 0.6 ||0.0  || 7.9
|-
| align="left" | 2007-08
| align="left" | Niigata
|34 || || 11.8 ||.391  || .273 ||.857  || 1.3 ||1.4  || 0.4 ||0.0  || 4.4
|-
| align="left" | 2008-09
| align="left" | Niigata
|49 ||32 || 11.9 ||.451  || .333 ||.811  || 1.1 ||1.6  || 0.2 ||0.0  || 4.9
|-
| align="left" | 2009-10
| align="left" | Niigata
|15 ||9 || 7.6 ||.389  || .286 ||.846  || 0.7 ||1.2  || 0.1 ||0.0  || 2.7
|-
| align="left" | 2010-11
| align="left" | Akita
|33 ||1 || 10.8 ||.407  || .352 ||.757  || 1.0 ||1.5  || 0.3 ||0.0  || 5.3
|-
| align="left" | 2011-12
| align="left" | Akita
|18 ||2 || 6.8 ||.296  || .214 ||1.000  || 0.7 ||0.9  || 0.1 ||0.0  || 1.3
|-
| align="left" | 2012-13
| align="left" | Akita
|10 || || 4.6 ||.353  || .286 ||.000  || 0.5 ||0.7  || 0.2 ||0.0  || 1.4
|-
|- class="sortbottom"
! style="text-align:center;" colspan=2| Career 2005-13

!222 || || 12.1 ||.428  || .331 ||.834  || 1.2 ||1.5  || 0.3 ||0.0  || 5.0
|-

Playoff games

|-
| align="left" | 2010-11
| align="left" | Akita
| 2 || || 14.5 || .375 || .000 || .000 || 3.0 ||4.5 ||0.5 || 0.0|| 3.0
|-
| align="left" | 2011-12
| align="left" | Akita
| 3 || || 2.3 || .000 || .000 || .000 || 1.0 ||0.3 ||0.0 || 0.0 || 0.0
|-

National team 

|-
|style="text-align:left;"|1998
|style="text-align:left;"|World Cup Japan
|5 || ||13.48 || .269 || .250 || .875 || 1.2 || 0.2 || 0.0 || 0.0 || 4.8
|-

Head coaching record

|- 
| style="text-align:left;"|Akita
| style="text-align:left;"|2014-15
| 52||41||11|||| style="text-align:center;"|1st in Eastern|||7||5||2||
| style="text-align:center;"|Eastern Champions
|-
| style="text-align:left;"|Akita
| style="text-align:left;"|2015-16
|52||35||17|||| style="text-align:center;"|3rd in Eastern|||6||5||1||
| style="text-align:center;"|3rd place
|-
| style="text-align:left;"|Akita
| style="background-color:#FFCCCC" "text-align:left;"|2016-17
| 60||18||42|||| style="text-align:center;"|5th in Eastern|||—||—||—||—
| style="text-align:center;"|relegated to B2
|-
|- class="sortbottom"
! style="text-align:center;" colspan="2" | Career
! 164||94||70|||| ||13||10||3||||

External links
Universiade 1995

References

1971 births
Living people
Akita Isuzu/Isuzu Motors Lynx/Giga Cats players
Akita Northern Happinets coaches
Akita Northern Happinets players
Asian Games medalists in basketball
Basketball players at the 1994 Asian Games
Japanese basketball coaches
Japanese men's basketball players
Japan national basketball team coaches
Niigata Albirex BB players
Nihon University alumni
Nihon University Red Sharks men's basketball players
Panasonic Trians players
San Diego Wildfire players
Sportspeople from Akita Prefecture
Universiade medalists in basketball
Asian Games bronze medalists for Japan
1998 FIBA World Championship players
Medalists at the 1994 Asian Games
Universiade silver medalists for Japan
Point guards
Medalists at the 1995 Summer Universiade